is the fourteenth episode of the Japanese anime television series Neon Genesis Evangelion, which was created by Gainax. The episode, written by Hideaki Anno, and directed by Masahiko Otsuka and Ken Ando, was first broadcast on TV Tokyo on January 3, 1996. The series is set fifteen years after a worldwide cataclysm known as Second Impact and is mostly set in the futuristic, fortified city of Tokyo-3. The series' protagonist is Shinji Ikari, a teenage boy who is recruited by his father Gendo to the special military organization Nerv to pilot a gigantic, bio-mechanical mecha named Evangelion into combat with beings called Angels. In the course of the episode, a secret sect named Seele examines Gendo Ikari's actions to determine whether his actions are in accordance with the organisation's plans, which follow ancient documents called Dead Sea Scrolls. Evangelion's pilots are tested; during her test, Rei Ayanami has a long stream of consciousness in which she investigates her identity.

During the making of the series, director Anno felt he had neglected Rei's character, so he tried to devote space to her by writing an inner monologue of her by depicting her as a girl with schizophrenia. A friend of his a volume on mental illness with a poem written by a nervous sufferer, and thanks to the book Anno wrote Rei's monologue then inserted more and more psychological introspection in the episodes to follow.

"Weaving a Story" drew a 0.9% audience share on Japanese television. The first part of the episode, a summary of the previous thirteen, was deemed both useful and superfluous by reviewers. In contrast, Rei's inner monologue and the direction of the installment attracted positive comments.

Plot
The first half of this episode is a clip show, in the form of a report by the secret organization Seele reviewing the actions of Gendo Ikari, commander of the special agency Nerv, summarizing the first season of episodes and the story up until this point. In the second half, Nerv's scientist Ritsuko Akagi conducts an experiment to determine if pilots can be switched between the Evangelion mechas they normally pilot. Pilot Rei Ayanami can synchronize with Unit-01 fairly well, but when Shinji Ikari attempts to synchronize with Unit-00, it goes violently berserk inside of the base. Unit-00 attacks the hangar's observation booth, smashing the window. However, Rei was standing at the window instead of Gendo, causing Major Misato Katsuragi to wonder if Unit-00 was trying to kill Rei. Meanwhile, Ritsuko feels that Unit-00 was trying to attack her. At the end of the episode, Rei uses Unit-00 to bring a giant weapon named Spear of Longinus recovered from Antarctica to the deepest level of Nerv's base, the Terminal Dogma.

Production
In 1993, Gainax published a presentation document for Neon Genesis Evangelion entitled , containing the initial synopsis for the planned episodes. For the first twelve episodes aired, the company roughly followed the schedule envisioned by the "Proposal," with only a few minor script differences. From the thirteenth episode onward, however, the production deviated from the original plan of the writers and from what was initially envisioned in the submission document. The fourteenth episode of the series was to be titled ; during the installment, the second of a trilogy of episodes with the same basic theme, Shinji would learn "true fear and despair". The staff in progress abandoned the original project, and some of the ideas for the trilogy were later transferred and condensed into the sixteenth episode, "Splitting of the Breast". Neon Genesis Evangelion main director Hideaki Anno initially intended to give the whole story of the anime a happy ending, but during production he realized that he had created characters that were too problematic, so he changed his plans. According to Hiroki Azuma, a culture critic who personally interviewed the director, Anno during the airing of the series also began to criticize otakus, whom he considered too closed-minded and introverted, so he changed his original plans by creating a more dramatic and introspective story toward the middle of the series.

Hideaki Anno wrote the screenplay and produced the storyboards. Masahiko Otsuka and Ken Ando acted as directors. Kazuya Tsurumaki and Masayuki, the two assistant directors of the series, took care of the main designs working together with Hisaki Furukawa, Shohei Sotoyama, and Yasuhiro Kamikura. Production involved other studios besides Gainax, such as Cosmos, Studio Bihou and Maki Productions. Anno worked on "Weaving a Story" at the same time as the production of the sixteenth episode. During the making of the series, he felt particularly conflicted about the character of Rei Ayanami. Anno tried to bring a hidden side of his psyche into the character, portraying her as a representation of his unconscious. In spite of this he felt uneasy, because he did not really feel interested in or akin to Rei. During the course of the episodes, he devoted very little space to the character, and halfway through the series he decided to devote more space to Rei inserting an inner monologue of her. Initially, the director thought of portraying Rei as a girl suffering from schizophrenia, and tried to "talk about himself". Despite his attempts, however, he could not write the monologue. To help him, a friend of his lent him a volume from a series of magazine-like books called  on mental illness, inside which was a poem written by a mentally ill person. The poem deeply affected Anno, and he was finally able to write the monologue in one go. From then on, the concept of the series veered in an introspective direction, in an attempt to describe how the human mind works.

Most of the episode consists of a summary of the previous thirteen installments, with the use of numerous captions written in Matisse Mincho font and in bold type. The entire first part is also devoid of background music; the staff also kept character lines to a minimum. The second part, on the other hand, while presenting unedited sequences and continuing the plot, consists of images constructed using photographic material collected from previous episodes. The number of new frames was reduced to only five hundred. Whilst normally for summary episodes duplicate films of the scenes already filmed are used, Neon Genesis Evangelion decided to re-photograph the component drawings for "Weaving a Story" instead. For the scene of Sachiel's attack, the crew intentionally deleted the flying VTOL vehicles present in the original installment. The staff also added sequences with different colouring, such as the scene where the Eva-00 goes berserk. Takashi Nagasako, Junko Iwao, Takehito Koyasu, Katsumi Suzuki, Miki Nagasawa, Tetsuya Iwanaga and Kotono Mitsuishi played unidentified characters audible in the background of the scenes of "Weaving a Story". Yoko Takahashi, who had already sung the opening theme song, also sang a version of "Fly Me to the Moon" which was later used as the episode's closing theme song, later replaced in later editions of the series by a version called "Rei solo/Normal".

Cultural references and themes
According to Kazuya Tsurumaki, assistant director of the series, Anno may have taken inspiration from the 45th episode of Mobile Suit Victory Gundam, "Uso Dances in Hallucination", to compose "Weaving a Story"; like the Gundam episode, "Weaving a Story" is a summary episode that is not really one, telling something new instead. Evangelion Chronicle magazine compared the heavy use of captions in the first part of "Weaving a Story" to the films of director Kon Ichikawa, and the Furuhata Ninzaburo series. The Japanese title of the episode was translated in the English edition as "Seele, the throne of the soul". Carl Gustav Horn, editor of the North American edition of the manga, linked the "throne of the soul" to the Jewish Kabbalah, describing it as "a very Sephirothic concept". Critic Mario Pasqualini noted how the character  could also be translated as "theater", linking the title translation "Theatre of the Soul" to the last episodes of the series, in which the characters of the series undergo therapy in a metaphysical theater.

"Weaving a Story" contains the first explicit mention in the anime of the Dead Sea Scrolls, a series of secret documents in Seele's possession. The name refers to the real Dead Sea Scrolls, discovered in a cave on the northwest coast of the Dead Sea region in Palestine in 1947. It is rumoured that parts of these ancient manuscripts were hidden by the Vatican because of inconvenient material that could shake the foundations of the Christian religion. According to the character designer of the series, Yoshiyuki Sadamoto, the post-apocalyptic scenario and the use of the Dead Sea scrolls in Neon Genesis Evangelion are a "side effect" of Nadia: The Secret of Blue Water, a previous work by Gainax and Anno. Rei mentions the "Red Earth" in her monologue, a reference to some theories about the etymology of the name Adam, according to which it means "earth" or "red". In the final scene of the episode, the spear of Longinus is also mentioned for the first time. The spear is named after the legendary Roman soldier who used his spear to pierce Jesus Christ when he was crucified on Golgotha; legend has it that whoever wields this spear impregnated with Christ's blood will control the world. Furthermore, "Weaving a Story" presents for the first time the real names of the Angels who appeared in the previous episodes. Their names all refer to real angels from the apocryphal Judeo-Christian manuscripts; the characteristics of each Angel are also linked to them, forming a complex web of symbolism.

The episode is the first to paint the inner world of a character, Rei, offering a long poetic monologue marked by a series of seemingly disconnected images and memories. Writer Dani Cavallaro has described Rei's monologue as a set of "stream-of-consciousness reflections". Mechademia academic magazine noted how it is labeled "Rei's poem" by fans for its "fragmentary, cryptic nature". The fundamental theme of the second half of the series thus becomes that of the representation of the characters' psyche and the investigation of the "human heart", reaching its climax in the finale. In the course of the monologue Rei asks "Who am I?" and "Who are you?"; several identical images of the girl arranged in a row also appear in the scene. Writer Dennis Redmond linked Ayanami's questions to "Who is No.1?", the refrain from The Prisoner, and to the key line "Who am I?" from Heiner Müller's Germania Death in Berlin. According to Redmond, Rei's multiple images are reminiscent of the clones and androids endemic to 1970s science fiction, while the images appearing during Rei's poem "suggest a spectrum from classic East Asian mythology", such as the creation of Monkey King in Journey to the West from the union of Heaven and Earth, referred to by Rei as "sky and mountains". Mechademia writer Mariana Ortega also noted how Asuka compares Eva-01 to the maternal breast and womb during the installment, another theme presented in the following episodes.

Reception
"Weaving a Story" was first broadcast on January 3, 1996, at 8:00 AM, an unusual time for Neon Genesis Evangelion due to a New Year's rescheduling, and thus drew a 0.9% audience share on Japanese television, the lowest in the entire series. Merchandise on the episode has also been released. Akio Nagatomi of The Anime Café positively received the episode. The summary of the previous installments is in his opinion useful; Nagatomi also found Rei's soliloquy "fascinating", concluding his review by saying, "Not an exciting episode, but very important in its content". Film School Rejects' Max Covill, on the other hand, commented negatively on "Weaving a Story", placing it second to last in his ranking of the Neon Genesis Evangelion episodes and criticizing the heavy recycling of animations already used. According to anime critic Dani Cavallaro, the installment constitutes "an adventurous piece of cinematography right from the start", while writer Dennis Redmond described Rei's monologue as an "astonishingly beautiful dream sequence".

References
  Text was copied/adapted from Episode 14 at Evageeks wiki, which is released under a Creative Commons Attribution-Share Alike 3.0 (Unported) (CC-BY-SA 3.0) license.

Citations

Bibliography

External links
 

1996 Japanese television episodes
Neon Genesis Evangelion episodes